Killer Joe may refer to:
 "Killer Joe", a jazz standard composed by Benny Golson, which first appeared on the record Meet the Jazztet (1960)
 Killer Joe (Benny Golson album), 1977
 Killer Joe (Jimmy Osmond album), 1972
 Killer Joe (George Kawaguchi & Art Blakey album), 1981
 Killer Joe (play), a 1993 play by Tracy Letts
 Killer Joe (film), a 2011 film directed by William Friedkin
 Killer Joe Piro (1921–1989), a dance instructor
 Killer Joe, a band formed by Australian jazz vocalist Joe Lane
 "Killer Joe", a 1963 song performed by the Rocky Fellers and the Rivieras